Pablo Vázquez Pérez (born 7 October 1994) is a Spanish footballer who plays for FC Cartagena. Mainly a central defender, he can also play as a defensive midfielder.

Club career
Vázquez was born in Gandia, Valencian Community, and made his senior debut with CD Llosa in 2013, in Tercera División. In June 2014 he moved to fellow league team Ontinyent CF, becoming an immediate first-choice at the club.

On 14 July 2015, Vázquez signed for San Fernando CD also in the fourth division. Roughly one year later, he agreed to a one-year contract with Córdoba CF, being assigned to the reserves in Segunda División B.

Vázquez made his professional debut on 12 October 2016, starting in a 2–1 Copa del Rey away win against Cádiz CF. The following 10 July he moved to another reserve team, Granada CF B in the third division.

On 15 January 2018, Vázquez was loaned to AD Alcorcón in Segunda División, until June. Upon returning, he signed a new two-year contract on 16 August, being definitely promoted to the main squad.

Vázquez scored his first professional goal on 13 September 2018, netting his team's only in a 1–2 loss at Elche CF for the national cup. The following 23 January, after failing to make a league appearance during the first half of the campaign, he was loaned to third division side Cultural y Deportiva Leonesa until June.

On 23 July 2019, upon returning from loan, Vázquez terminated his contract with the Andalusians, and signed for third division side CD Badajoz just hours later. On 18 June 2021, he returned to the second level after agreeing to a one-year deal with  FC Cartagena.

References

External links

1994 births
Living people
People from Gandia
Sportspeople from the Province of Valencia
Spanish footballers
Footballers from the Valencian Community
Association football defenders
Association football midfielders
Segunda División players
Segunda División B players
Tercera División players
Ontinyent CF players
San Fernando CD players
Córdoba CF B players
Córdoba CF players
Club Recreativo Granada players
AD Alcorcón footballers
Granada CF footballers
Cultural Leonesa footballers
CD Badajoz players
FC Cartagena footballers